Giovanni Giustiniani Longo (Greek: Ιωάννης Λόνγος Ιουστινιάνης, Iōánnēs Lóngos Ioustiniánēs; Latin: Ioannes Iustinianus Longus; 1418 – 1 June 1453) was a Genoese nobleman, captain, and defender of Constantinople during its siege in 1453. He was instrumental in its defense and commanded 700 men, as well as leading the land forces protecting the city.

Family and early life 
Giustiniani was a member of the powerful House of Doria and was probably native to the island of Chios. Although little is known of his origin, Giustiniani was known to be a mercenary soldier, and was an expert at defending besieged cities.

Siege of Constantinople 
Upon hearing of the plight of Constantinople, Giustiniani (along with 700 men from Chios and Genoa) sailed to defend the city, arriving in late January to prepare for the siege. Constantine XI strategically placed this contingent to the right of his own position, and appointed Giustiniani to the rank of Protostrator.

Constantine appointed Giustiniani as the leader of the city's land defenses, and prior to the siege he was tasked with training soldiers, reinforcing fortifications, and generally preparing for the imminent attack. Learning from the siege of 1422, he directed the defense efforts at the outer walls, with Archbishop Leonardo di Chio's suggestion that the inner walls be prioritized being dismissed due to their supposed disrepair. During this stage, there was no manpower deficiency, though it became clear that there would only be 8,000-9,000 people to defend Constantinople. Noting that the city lacked funds to pay its defenders, Constantine used church jewelry and silverware to mint coins to pay the soldiers. Giustiniani was placed on the right of the most strategic and lowest lying section of the walls, between St. Romanos and Charisius. Immediately, he reorganised the army, trained the city's recruits in modern weaponry, and removed men who had fled to monasteries with the hope of escaping military duties, instead directing them to Constantinople's defensive efforts. Giustiniani also reinforced the wall's most critical points with his 700 Genoese mercenaries.  

Upon Sultan Mehmed's arrival on April 6, Giustiniani began commanding sorties to counterattack the Ottoman position. These are recorded as being very successful, and resulted in the destruction of Ottoman troops, siege works and artillery. However, sorties were gradually abandoned due to their high death rates. His approach regarding wall repairs was also a hindrance to the Ottomans; his strategy involved cushioning the blow of artillery fire by covering the walls in soft surfaces, and then filling gaps created by cannonballs with debris (which turned out to be highly effective as the cannonballs would simply sink into the rubble). Throughout the siege, Giustiniani and his men repaired the damaged walls, plugging gaps with soldiers to repel assaults when necessary. He also made use of small artillery pieces containing grapeshot, projectiles and items to drop on attackers attempting to scale the walls. 

The first assault occurred on 18 April, with a detachment of Janissaries and archers being sent towards a breach in the middle section of the walls. Giustiniani and his men were able to repel this attack after 4 hours due to the narrow front - as the breach had been a small one, the Ottoman troops were unable to take advantage of their superior numbers.  

By late May, dwindling supplies and manpower coupled with the knowledge that no relief army would save Constantinople caused tensions to run high, and amidst this Giustiniani and Notaras (the Byzantine chief minister) are reported to have had a falling out.

Death 
In the early hours of 29 May, the final Ottoman assault began, with the most forces concentrated in the center of the walls. The first wave of troops, Christian troops provided by vassals of Mehmed, attempted to scale the improvised stockades erected by Giustiniani's men, but were unsuccessful. A second wave proceeded to attack, most notably at a breach near the St. Romanos gate, but were once again repelled by early morning. The last wave consisted of elite Janissaries, who assaulted the wall and by this point were faced by no more than 3,000 exhausted troops led by Giustiniani.

Giustiniani's downfall came during this assault, when a cannon or crossbow bolt severely wounded his arm, chest or leg, forcing a retreat from his combat station. As he exited the battle, the defenders' morale was severely weakened and men began to flee in panic. Giustiniani was taken to his ship with hopes of his wounds being cared for, and as it became known that Constantinople had fallen, fled alongside his men. Sources hostile towards the Genoese (such as the Venetian Nicolò Barbaro), however, report that he was only lightly wounded or not wounded at all, but, overwhelmed by fear, simulated the wound to abandon the battlefield, determining the fall of the city. These charges of cowardice and treason were so widespread that the Republic of Genoa had to deny them by sending diplomatic letters to the Chancelleries of England, France, the Duchy of Burgundy and others.

Giustiniani succumbed to his wounds on 1 June, and was taken to the Genoese island of Chios. He was laid to rest at the Church of San Domenico in Pyrgi, Chios and although his tomb is lost (possibly from the 1881 earthquake), several descriptions survive.

Portrayals 

 Giustiniani is played by Kemal Ergünenç in the Turkish film İstanbul'un Fethi (1951)
 Cengiz Coşkun plays Giustiniani in the Turkish film Fetih 1453 (2012). In the film, he is killed by Ulubatlı Hasan (İbrahim Çelikkol) during the last day in the siege of Constantinople.
 He appears as a major character in Mika Waltari's novel The Dark Angel
 He appears as a major character in the historical novel Porphyry and Ash by Peter Sandham
 He is portrayed by Birkan Sokullu in the Turkish historical docuseries Rise of Empires: Ottoman (2020)

See also 
Fall of Constantinople

References 

1418 births
1453 deaths
15th-century Byzantine military personnel
15th-century Genoese people
Italian soldiers
Byzantine generals
Giovanni
People from Chios
People of the Byzantine–Ottoman wars
Protostratores
Fall of Constantinople